Lucie Chainel-Lefèvre (born 2 July 1983) is a French cyclo-cross racing cyclist. She won the bronze medal at the 2013 UCI Cyclo-cross World Championships in Louisville, United States. She was married to racing cyclist Steve Chainel but they separated in 2017.

External links

1983 births
Living people
Sportspeople from Montbéliard
French female cyclists
Cyclo-cross cyclists
Cyclists from Bourgogne-Franche-Comté